Mount Holcroft is located on the border of Alberta and British Columbia on the Continental Divide. It was named after Herbert Spencer Holcroft (1877-1916), H.S. D.L.S. in 1918. Lieutenant Spencer was wounded during World War I and later died in hospital of cardiac failure.

See also
List of peaks on the British Columbia–Alberta border

References

Two-thousanders of Alberta
Two-thousanders of British Columbia
Canadian Rockies